Villiam Vecchi (28 December 1948 – 3 August 2022) was an Italian footballer who played as a goalkeeper and later worked as a goalkeeping coach.

Club career
Born in Scandiano, Reggio Emilia, Vecchi played with AC Milan from 1967 to 1974, and joined Como in 1976. In his five years with the club, Como endured a rollercoaster ride through Serie B and Serie C1 before making the top flight in 1980, where they remained as he departed after the 1980–81 campaign; Como were relegated back to Serie B the following season.

Coaching career
Vecchi has the distinction of having trained both Dida and Gianluigi Buffon, who were two of the best goalkeepers in the world during the 2000s; he coached the latter during a stint with Parma, under the helm of head coach Carlo Ancelotti, while he trained the former during his time with AC Milan, once again under Ancelotti.

In 2013, Vecchi was announced as the new goalkeeper coach for Real Madrid; under Italian manager Carlo Ancelotti, he trained Iker Casillas, Diego López, Keylor Navas, and Pacheco during his spell with the club. On 25 May 2015, Vecchi left his job at the Spanish side following club president Florentino Pérez's decision to sack Ancelotti who had failed to win a major tournament in his second season with the club.

References

External links
July 2003 Forza Milan! article by Carlo Pellegatti, reprinted 9/13/03 on xtratime.org (translated into English)

1948 births
2022 deaths
Sportspeople from Reggio Emilia
Italian footballers
Footballers from Emilia-Romagna
Association football goalkeepers
Italy under-21 international footballers
Serie A players
Serie B players
Serie C players
A.C. Milan players
Cagliari Calcio players
Como 1907 players
S.P.A.L. players
A.C. Reggiana 1919 managers
Parma Calcio 1913 managers
Juventus F.C. managers
A.C. Milan managers
Real Madrid CF managers